Avraham Verdiger  (6 May 1921 – 27 November 2013) was an Israeli politician who served as a member of the Knesset for several ultra-Orthodox parties between 1965 and 1996.

Biography
Born in Łódź in Poland, Verdiger made aliyah as a Zionist returnee to Mandatory Palestine in 1947. He was on the Poalei Agudat Yisrael list for the 1965 elections, and although he failed to win a seat, he entered the Knesset on 21 December 1967 as a replacement for the deceased Ya'akov Katz. He was re-elected in elections in 1969 and 1973 (in which Poalei Agudat Yisrael ran as part of the Religious Torah Front alliance), before losing his seat in the 1977 elections.

In 1984 he joined the new Morasha party, and was elected to the Knesset on its list. Prior to the 1988 elections the party joined Agudat Yisrael, and Verdiger was re-elected on their list. On 27 November 1990, he was appointed Deputy Minister of Jerusalem Affairs. He lost his seat and ministerial post following the 1992 elections (in which the party ran as part of the United Torah Judaism alliance), but returned to the Knesset again on 28 June 1994 as a replacement for Menachem Porush. He lost his seat again in the 1996 elections.

References

External links

1921 births
2013 deaths
Politicians from Łódź
People from Łódź Voivodeship (1919–1939)
Polish emigrants to Mandatory Palestine
20th-century Polish Jews
Poalei Agudat Yisrael politicians
Religious Torah Front politicians
Morasha politicians
United Torah Judaism politicians
Agudat Yisrael politicians
Members of the 6th Knesset (1965–1969)
Members of the 7th Knesset (1969–1974)
Members of the 8th Knesset (1974–1977)
Members of the 11th Knesset (1984–1988)
Members of the 12th Knesset (1988–1992)
Members of the 13th Knesset (1992–1996)
Deputy ministers of Israel
Jewish Israeli politicians
Israeli Jews